Baberowski is a Polish language habitational surname for someone from a place called Baberow. Notable people with the name include:

 Dirk Baberowski, German professional Magic: The Gathering player
 Jörg Baberowski (1961), German historian

References 

Polish-language surnames
Polish toponymic surnames